The Afghan Jamhuriat Hospital is a state-owned hospital in Kabul, Afghanistan. It is located in the affluent Shahr-e Naw neighborhood, near the Afghan Presidential Palace and Abdul Rahman Mosque. The hospital is a 10-storey building with the capacity of housing 350 patients. It was constructed in 2004 by engineers from China and laborers from Afghanistan. 

Pajhwok Afghan News reported in 2011 that the Agha Khan Network would be in charge of managing the hospital.

See also
List of hospitals in Afghanistan

References

External links
 AGO Probes Embezzlement Reports at Jamhuriat Hospital (TOLOnews, June 2, 2020)

Hospital buildings completed in 2004
Hospitals in Kabul